Mario Sábato (born February 15, 1945) is an Argentine film director and screenwriter. He is the son of the famed writer Ernesto Sábato.

He worked mainly in the Cinema of Argentina best known for his children's comedy films.

Filmography
 Y que patatín...y que patatán (1971)
 ¡Hola Señor León! (1973)
 Los golpes bajos (1974)
 Un mundo de amor (1975)
 Los superagentes biónicos (1977)
 Los superagentes y el tesoro maldito (1978)
 El poder de las tinieblas (1979)
 Tiro al aire (1980)
 Los Parchís contra el inventor invisible (1981)
 La magia de Los Parchís (1982)
 Las aventuras de los Parchís (1982)
 Superagentes y titanes (1983)
 Al corazón (1995)
 India Pravile (2003)
 Ernesto Sabato, mi padre (documentary, 2010)

References

External links
Photograph

1945 births
Argentine film directors
Argentine screenwriters
Male screenwriters
Argentine male writers
Living people
Argentine people of Arbëreshë descent